is a Japanese filmmaker.

Life and career

Shūsuke Kaneko was born in Tokyo on June 8, 1955. According to the biography on his official website Kaneko was interested in science fiction, particularly Godzilla and Gamera films, from a young age. He became involved in amateur film making in his teen years, but majored in education when he attended Tokyo Gakugei University. After graduation, he found a job at the major Japanese movie studio Nikkatsu. By 1982 he was a screenwriter and assistant director for Nikkatsu's Roman Porno film series. He made his debut as a director with Nikkatsu in February 1984 with Kōichirō Uno's Wet and Swinging, part of a long-running Nikkatsu series based on the works of erotic novelist Kōichirō Uno. The next year, his manga-based April 1985 movie for Nikkatsu, Minna Agechau, took the award as the 9th Best Film of the year at the 7th Yokohama Film Festival. In July 1986, still at Nikkatsu, he directed , which despite its strange title, was a fantasy about a sex-doll coming to life as a woman. Kaneko's final film for Nikkatsu was the appropriately named Last Cabaret, the second to last of the studio's Roman Porno series. The film, released in April 1988, about a cabaret forced to close has been taken as a metaphor for the demise of the studio itself.

The year 1988 marked a watershed in Kaneko's career as a director. At the 10th Yokohama Film Festival, he was given the Best Director award for his two films of 1988, the Roman Porno Last Cabaret for Nikkatsu and Summer Vacation 1999, a mainstream film for the Shochiku studio. Nikkatsu ceased their Roman Porno film line that year and filed for bankruptcy a few years later and Kaneko moved full-time into mainstream film.

Filmography

Assistant director
 From Orion's Testimony: Formula for Murder (1978)
 Rape and Death of a Housewife (1978)
 Koko dai panikku (1978)
 Female Teacher Hunting (1982)
 Gigolo: A Docu-Drama (1982)
 Ecstasy Sisters (1982)
 Oh! Takarazuka (1982)
 The Family Game (1983)
 Girl Rape Case: Red Shoes (1983)
 Madam Scandal - Final Scandal: Madam Likes It Hard (1983)
 Main Theme (1984)

References

External links
 Shusuke Kaneko Information Website (official website)
 Shusuke Kaneko Information Website (official website) 
 http://www.tohokingdom.com/people/shusuke_kaneko.htm
 

1955 births
Japanese film directors
Japanese screenwriters
Pink film directors
Living people